Studzienice  is a village in Bytów County, Pomeranian Voivodeship, in northern Poland. It is the seat of the administrative district called Gmina Studzienice. The village has a population of 816. It is located within the historic region of Pomerania.

Studzienice was a private village, owned by various local Kashubian nobles. It remained under the suzerainty of Poland, held by the Duchy of Pomerania, until 1637, afterwards it was directly under Polish rule as part of the Pomeranian Voivodeship, and after 1657 it was a Polish fief again, held by Brandenburg-Prussia, and annexed by the Kingdom of Prussia after the First Partition of Poland in 1772. From 1871 it was also part of Germany. During World War II the Germans operated a labor camp for prisoners of war from the Stalag II-B prisoner-of-war camp in the village. After the defeat of Nazi Germany in World War II, in 1945, the village became again part of Poland.

References

Map of Gmina Studzienice

Villages in Bytów County